The  is a women's professional wrestling championship owned by the World Wonder Ring Stardom promotion. The title was originally created on May 5, 2009, in the NEO Japan Ladies Pro-Wrestling promotion, where Natsuki☆Taiyo defeated Ray to become the inaugural champion. As the name of the title suggests, it is meant for fast and high-flying wrestlers. On November 19, 2010, Stardom acquired the rights to the High Speed Championship from NEO, which had announced it would be folding after December 31. On July 24, 2011, Natsuki☆Taiyo, now affiliated with Stardom, defeated JWP Joshi Puroresu's Leon to officially bring the title over to the promotion.

Title history

Names

Reigns
Natsuki☆Taiyo was the first champion in the title's history. She also holds the records for most reigns, with four, and the longest reign in the title's history at 679 days, achieved on her third reign. Koguma's only reign of 84 days is the shortest in the title's history. Overall, there have been 22 reigns shared among 16 different wrestlers. Like most professional wrestling championships, the title is won as a result of a scripted match. AZM is the current champion in her second reign.

Names

Reigns

Combined reigns

See also
Sky High of Arsion Championship

Notes

References

External links
World Wonder Ring Stardom's official website
High Speed Championship history at Wrestling-Titles.com
NEO High Speed Championship history at NEOPro.ne07.jp

NEO Japan Ladies Pro Wrestling championships
World Wonder Ring Stardom championships
Women's professional wrestling championships